The 2022–23 Los Angeles Kings season is the 56th season (55th season of play) for the National Hockey League franchise that was established  on June 5, 1967.

This is the first season without longtime winger Dustin Brown on the roster as he announced his retirement on April 28, 2022, following the 2022 Stanley Cup playoffs. This season would also be their last with longtime goaltender and Conn Smythe Trophy winner Jonathan Quick, who was traded on March 1, 2023 to the Columbus Blue Jackets.

Standings

Divisional standings

Conference standings

Schedule and results

Preseason
The preseason schedule was published on July 5, 2022.

|- style="background:#ffc;"
| 1 || September 25 || @ San Jose || 2–3 || OT || Villalta || SAP Center || 9,042 || 0–0–1 || 
|- style="background:#cfc;"
| 2 || September 26 || @ Vegas || 2–1 || OT || Copley || T-Mobile Arena || 17,026 || 1–0–1 || 
|- style="background:#fcc;"
| 3 || September 28 || San Jose || 1–3 || || Villalta || Toyota Arena ||  || 1–1–1 || 
|- style="background:#cfc;"
| 4 || October 2 || Anaheim || 2–1 || || Quick || Crypto.com Arena || 12,031 || 2–1–1 || 
|- style="background:#fcc;"
| 5 || October 4 || @ Anaheim || 4–5 || || Petersen || Honda Center || 12,968 || 2–2–1 || 
|- style="background:#fcc;"
| 6 || October 6 || Vegas || 4–6 || || Petersen || Vivint Arena ||  || 2–3–1 || 
|- style="background:#cfc;"
| 7 || October 8 || Anaheim || 6–3 || || Quick || Crypto.com Arena || 12,845 || 3–3–1 || 
|-

Regular season
The regular season schedule was released on July 6, 2022,

|- style="background:#fcc;"
| 1 || October 11 || Vegas Golden Knights || 3–4 ||  || Quick || Crypto.com Arena || 18,230 || 0–1–0 || 0 || 
|- style="background:#fcc;"
| 2 || October 13 || Seattle Kraken || 1–4 ||  || Quick || Crypto.com Arena || 15,645 || 0–2–0 || 0 || 
|- style="background:#cfc;"
| 3 || October 15 || @ Minnesota Wild || 7–6 ||  || Petersen || Xcel Energy Center || 18,421 || 1–2–0 || 2 || 
|- style="background:#cfc;"
| 4 || October 17 || @ Detroit Red Wings || 5–4 || OT || Quick || Little Caesars Arena || 15,919 || 2–2–0 || 4 || 
|- style="background:#cfc;"
| 5 || October 18 || @ Nashville Predators || 4–3 || SO || Petersen || Bridgestone Arena || 17,159 || 3–2–0 || 6 || 
|- style="background:#fcc;"
| 6 || October 20 || @ Pittsburgh Penguins || 1–6 ||  || Petersen || PPG Paints Arena || 17,136 || 3–3–0 || 6 || 
|- style="background:#fcc;"
| 7 || October 22 || @ Washington Capitals || 3–4 ||  || Quick || Capital One Arena || 18,573 || 3–4–0 || 6 || 
|- style="background:#cfc;"
| 8 || October 25 || Tampa Bay Lightning || 4–2 ||  || Quick || Crypto.com Arena || 16,480 || 4–4–0 || 8 || 
|- style="background:#fcc;"
| 9 || October 27 || Winnipeg Jets || 4–6 ||  || Quick || Crypto.com Arena || 15,716 || 4–5–0 || 8 || 
|- style="background:#cfc;"
| 10 || October 29|| Toronto Maple Leafs || 4–2 ||  || Petersen || Crypto.com Arena || 17,530 || 5–5–0 || 10 || 
|- style="background:#cfc;"
| 11 || October 31 || @ St. Louis Blues || 5–1 ||  || Quick || Enterprise Center || 17,220 || 6–5–0 || 12 || 
|-

|- style="background:#fcc;"
| 12 || November 1 || @ Dallas Stars || 2–5 ||  || Petersen || American Airlines Center || 18,374 || 6–6–0 || 12 || 
|- style="background:#ffc;"
| 13 || November 3 || @ Chicago Blackhawks || 1–2 || OT || Quick || United Center || 16,658 || 6–6–1 || 13 || 
|- style="background:#cfc;"
| 14 || November 5 || Florida Panthers || 5–4 ||  || Quick || Crypto.com Arena || 16,161 || 7–6–1 || 15 || 
|- style="background:#cfc;"
| 15 || November 8 || Minnesota Wild || 1–0 ||  || Quick || Crypto.com Arena || 13,558 || 8–6–1 || 17 || 
|- style="background:#cfc;"
| 16 || November 10 || Chicago Blackhawks || 2–1 || OT || Quick || Crypto.com Arena || 16,443 || 9–6–1 || 19 || 
|- style="background:#cfc;"
| 17 || November 12 || Detroit Red Wings || 4–3 ||  || Petersen || Crypto.com Arena || 18,230 || 10–6–1 || 21 || 
|- style="background:#fcc;"
| 18 || November 14 || @ Calgary Flames || 5–6 ||  || Quick || Scotiabank Saddledome || 17,308 || 10–7–1 || 21 || 
|- style="background:#cfc;"
| 19 || November 16 || @ Edmonton Oilers || 3–1 ||  || Petersen || Rogers Place || 16,943 || 11–7–1 || 23 || 
|- style="background:#fcc;"
| 20 || November 18 || @ Vancouver Canucks || 1–4 ||  || Quick || Rogers Arena || 18,841 || 11–8–1 || 23 || 
|- style="background:#ffc;"
| 21 || November 19 || @ Seattle Kraken || 2–3 || OT || Petersen || Climate Pledge Arena || 17,151 || 11–8–2 || 24 || 
|- style="background:#fcc;"
| 22 || November 22 || New York Rangers || 3–5 ||  || Petersen || Crypto.com Arena || 18,230 || 11–9–2 || 24 || 
|- style="background:#cfc;"
| 23 || November 25 || @ San Jose Sharks || 5–2 ||  || Quick || SAP Center || 17,562 || 12–9–2  || 26 ||  
|- style="background:#ffc;"
| 24 || November 27 || Ottawa Senators || 2–3  || OT || Quick || Crypto.com Arena || 15,136 || 12–9–3  || 27  || 
|- style="background:#ffc;"
| 25 || November 29 || Seattle Kraken || 8–9 || OT || Petersen || Crypto.com Arena || 13,215 || 12–9–4 || 28 || 
|-

|- style="background:#cfc;"
| 26 || December 1 || Arizona Coyotes || 5–3 ||  || Quick || Crypto.com Arena || 13,764 || 13–9–4 || 30 || 
|- style="background:#fcc;"
| 27 || December 3 || Carolina Hurricanes || 2–4 ||  || Quick || Crypto.com Arena || 16,067 || 13–10–4 || 30 || 
|- style="background:#cfc;"
| 28 || December 6 || @ Ottawa Senators || 5–2 ||  || Copley || Canadian Tire Centre || 13,459 || 14–10–4 || 32 || 
|- style="background:#fcc;"
| 29 || December 8 || @ Toronto Maple Leafs || 0–5 ||  || Quick || Scotiabank Arena || 18,567 || 14–11–4 || 32 || 
|- style="background:#cfc;"
| 30 || December 10 || @ Montreal Canadiens || 4–2 ||  || Copley || Bell Centre || 21,105 || 15–11–4 || 34 || 
|- style="background:#ffc;"
| 31 || December 11 || @ Columbus Blue Jackets || 5–6 || OT || Quick || Nationwide Arena || 14,560 || 15–11–5 || 35 ||   ||
|- style="background:#fcc"
| 32 || December 13 || @ Buffalo Sabres || 0–6 ||  || Copley || KeyBank Center || 12,873 || 15–12–5 || 35 || 
|- style="background:#cfc;"
| 33 || December 15 || @ Boston Bruins || 3–2 || SO || Copley || TD Garden || 17,850 || 16–12–5 || 37 || 
|- style="background:#cfc;"
| 34 || December 17 || San Jose Sharks || 3–2 || SO || Copley || Crypto.com Arena || 18,230 || 17–12–5 || 39 || 
|- style="background:#cfc;"
| 35 || December 20 || Anaheim Ducks || 4–1 ||  || Copley || Crypto.com Arena || 18,230 || 18–12–5 ||  41 || 
|- style="background:#cfc;"
| 36 || December 22 || Calgary Flames || 4–3 || OT || Copley || Crypto.com Arena || 16,731 || 19–12–5 || 43 || 
|- style="background:#ffc;"
| 37 || December 23 || @ Arizona Coyotes || 1–2 || SO || Quick || Mullett Arena || 4,600 || 19–12–6 || 44 || 
|- style="background:#cfc;"
| 38 || December 27 || Vegas Golden Knights || 4–2 ||  || Copley || Crypto.com Arena || 18,230 || 20–12–6 || 46 || 
|- style="background:#cfc;"
| 39 || December 29 || @ Colorado Avalanche || 5–4 || SO || Copley || Ball Arena || 18,132 || 21–12–6 || 48 || 
|- style="background:#fcc;"
| 40 || December 31 || Philadelphia Flyers || 2–4 ||  || Quick || Crypto.com Arena || 18,230 || 21–13–6 || 48 || 

|- style="background:#cfc;"
| 41 || January 3 || Dallas Stars || 3–2 ||  || Copley || Crypto.com Arena || 16,498 || 22–13–6 || 50 || 
|- style="background:#fcc;"
| 42 || January 5 || Boston Bruins || 2–5 ||  || Copley || Crypto.com Arena || 18,230 || 22–14–6 || 50 || 
|- style="background:#cfc;"
| 43 || January 7 || @ Vegas Golden Knights || 5–1 ||  || Copley || T-Mobile Arena || 18,339 || 23–14–6 || 52 || 
|- style="background:#cfc;"
| 44 || January 9 || Edmonton Oilers || 6–3 ||  || Copley || Crypto.com Arena || 16,039 || 24–14–6 || 54 || 
|- style="background:#cfc;"
| 45 || January 11 || San Jose Sharks || 4–3 ||  || Copley || Crypto.com Arena || 16,717 || 25–14–6 || 56 || 
|- style="background:#fcc;"
| 46 || January 14 || New Jersey Devils || 2–5 ||  || Quick || Crypto.com Arena || 18,230 || 25–15–6 || 56 || 
|- style="background:#fcc;"
| 47 || January 19 || Dallas Stars || 0–4 ||  || Copley || Crypto.com Arena || 18,230 || 25–16–6 || 56 || 
|- style="background:#fcc;"
| 48 || January 21 || @ Nashville Predators || 3–5 ||  || Quick || Bridgestone Arena || 17,654 || 25–17–6 || 56 || 
|- style="background:#cfc;"
| 49 || January 22 || @ Chicago Blackhawks || 2–1 ||  || Copley || United Center || 19,236 || 26–17–6 || 58 || 
|- style="background:#cfc;"
| 50 || January 24 || @ Philadelphia Flyers || 4–3 ||  OT || Copley || Wells Fargo Center || 15,602 || 27–17–6 || 60 || 
|- style="background:#cfc;"
| 51 || January 27 || @ Florida Panthers || 4–3 ||  || Copley || FLA Live Arena || 15,322 || 28–17–6 || 62 || 
|- style="background:#fcc;"
| 52 || January 28 || @ Tampa Bay Lightning || 2–5 ||  || Quick || Amalie Arena || 19,092 || 28–18–6 || 62 || 
|- style="background:#ffc;"
| 53 || January 31 || @ Carolina Hurricanes || 4–5 || OT || Copley || PNC Arena || 18,443 || 28–18–7 || 63 || 

|- style="background:#cfc;"
| 54 || February 11 || Pittsburgh Penguins || 6–0 ||  || Copley || Crypto.com Arena || 18,230 || 29–18–7 || 65 || 
|- style="background:#cfc;"
| 55 || February 13 || Buffalo Sabres || 5–2 ||  || Copley || Crypto.com Arena || 17,025 || 30–18–7 || 67 || 
|- style="background:#cfc;"
| 56 || February 17 || @ Anaheim Ducks || 6–3 ||  || Quick || Honda Center || 17,272 || 31–18–7 || 69 || 
|- style="background:#cfc;"
| 57 || February 18 || Arizona Coyotes || 6–5 || SO ||  Quick || Crypto.com Arena || 18,230 || 32–18–7 || 71 ||
|- style="background:#fcc;"
| 58 || February 21 || @ Minnesota Wild || 1–2 ||  || Copley || Xcel Energy Center || 18,012 || 32–19–7 || 71 || 
|- style="background:#ffc;"
| 59 || February 23 || @ New Jersey Devils || 3–4 || OT || Copley || Prudential Center || 15,397 || 32–19–8 || 72 || 
|- style="background:#cfc;"
| 60 || February 24 || @ New York Islanders || 3–2 ||  || Quick || UBS Arena || 17,255 || 33–19–8 || 74 || 
|- style="background:#fcc;"
| 61 || February 26 || @ New York Rangers || 2–5 ||  ||  Quick || Madison Square Garden || 18,006 || 33–20–8 || 74 || 
|- style="background:#cfc;"
| 62 || February 28 || @ Winnipeg Jets || 6–5 || SO || Copley || Canada Life Centre || 13,203 || 34–20–8 || 76 || 
|- style="background:#fcc;"

|- style="background:#cfc;"
| 63 || March 2 || Montreal Canadiens || 3–2 ||  || Copley || Crypto.com Arena || 16,974 || 35–20–8 || 78 || 
|- style="background:#cfc;"
| 64 || March 4 || St. Louis Blues || 4–2 ||  || Korpisalo || Crypto.com Arena || 18,230 || 36–20–8 || 80 || 
|- style="background:#cfc;"
| 65 || March 6 || Washington Capitals || 4–2 ||  || Copley || Crypto.com Arena || 17,577 || 37–20–8 || 82 || 
|- style="background:#cfc;"
| 66 || March 9 || @ Colorado Avalanche || 5–2 ||  || Korpisalo || Ball Arena || 18,117 || 38–20–8 || 84 || 
|- style="background:#ffc;"
| 67 || March 11 || Nashville Predators || 1–2 || SO || Copley || Crypto.com Arena || 18,230 || 38–20–9 || 85 || 
|- style="background:#cfc;"
| 68 || March 14 || New York Islanders || 5–2 ||  || Korpisalo || Crypto.com Arena || 15,989 || 39–20–9 || 87 || 
|- style="background:#cfc;"
| 69 || March 16 || Columbus Blue Jackets || 4–1 ||  || Copley || Crypto.com Arena || 15,460 || 40–20–9 || 89 || 
|- style="background:#ffc;"
| 70 || March 18 || Vancouver Canucks || 2–3 || SO || Korpisalo || Crypto.com Arena || 18,230 || 40–20–10 || 90 || 
|- style="background:#;"
| 71 || March 20 || Calgary Flames ||  ||  ||  || Crypto.com Arena ||  ||  ||  ||
|- style="background:#;"
| 72 || March 25 || Winnipeg Jets ||  ||  ||  || Crypto.com Arena ||  ||  ||  ||
|- style="background:#;"
| 73 || March 26 || St. Louis Blues ||  ||  ||  || Crypto.com Arena ||  ||  ||  ||
|- style="background:#;"
| 74 || March 28 || @ Calgary Flames ||  ||  ||  || Scotiabank Saddledome ||  ||  ||  ||
|- style="background:#;"
| 75 || March 30 || @ Edmonton Oilers ||  ||  ||  || Rogers Place ||  ||  ||  ||

|- style="background:#;"
| 76 || April 1 || @ Seattle Kraken ||  ||  ||  || Climate Pledge Arena ||  ||  ||  ||
|- style="background:#;"
| 77 || April 2 || @ Vancouver Canucks ||  ||  ||  || Rogers Arena ||  ||  ||  ||
|- style="background:#;"
| 78 || April 4 || Edmonton Oilers ||  ||  ||  || Crypto.com Arena ||  ||  ||  ||
|- style="background:#;"
| 79 || April 6 || @ Vegas Golden Knights ||  ||  ||  || T-Mobile Arena ||  ||  ||  ||
|- style="background:#;"
| 80 || April 8 || Colorado Avalanche ||  ||  ||  || Crypto.com Arena ||  ||  ||  ||
|- style="background:#;"
| 81 || April 10 || Vancouver Canucks ||  ||  ||  || Crypto.com Arena ||  ||  ||  ||
|- style="background:#;"
| 82 || April 13 || @ Anaheim Ducks ||  ||  ||  || Honda Center ||  ||  ||  ||

|-
|Legend:

Roster

Transactions
The Kings have been involved in the following transactions during the 2022–23 season.

Key:

 Contract is entry-level.
 Contract initially takes effect in the 2023–24 NHL season.

Trades

Players acquired

Players lost

Signings

Draft picks

Below are the Los Angeles Kings' selections at the 2022 NHL Entry Draft, which were held on July 7 to 8, 2022. It was held at the Bell Centre in Montreal, Quebec.

References

Los Angeles Kings seasons
Los Angeles Kings
Kings
Kings
Kings
Kings